Chicken Little is a 1943 short film created by Walt Disney during World War II and directed by Clyde Geronimi. The short was based on the European folk tale "Henny Penny", known in the United States as "Chicken Little". It is an anti-Nazi film showing the evils of mass hysteria.

The short was remade into a full-length film of the same name in 2005, with Zach Braff as the titular protagonist.

Plot
The narrator introduces the audience to the happy and content locals at the local poultry farm: Cocky Locky, Henny Penny, Turkey Lurkey, Ducky Lucky, Goosey Poosie and the titular Chicken Little (a yo-yo wielding simpleton)-all well protected. But little do they know, outside the yard, hungry fox Foxy Loxy has happened along and is intent on catching himself a chicken dinner. However, he cannot hop in and help himself due to the high fence, locked gates and a well-armed farmer. But Foxy Loxy is cunning, knowing there are other ways to steal a chicken. So taking advice from his psychology book, he states: "Why should I just get one, when I could get 'em all." He reads aloud a passage telling him that the best way to manipulate the whole flock is to begin with "the least intelligent" (identifying Chicken Little after searching the yard).

Loxy then breaks off a piece of wood from a fortune teller's sign, and then disorients Little with the suggestion of a thunderstorm before dropping it on his head pretending to be "the voice of doom". Loxy tells Little that the sky is falling, and a piece of it hit him on the head and then goes on to tell him that he should run for his life. Little panics spreading the word to everyone thus bringing a crowd to where he believes the sky piece hit him, but after the leader of the flock Cocky Locky inquires about the ordeal, he immediately proves the story to be false and afterwards, the crowd disperses, leaving Chicken Little humiliated.

Miffed that his plan did not work, Loxy refers to his book again to find something to deal with Locky finding a passage that tells him to "undermine the faith of the masses in their leaders". He heads over to Henny Penny's, Turkey Lurkey's, and Ducky Lucky's and Goosey Poosie's circles of friends to plant rumors about Locky's intelligence and leadership. This starts another rush of panic among the avians as they spread the rumor.

With Locky's leadership in question, Loxy uses it to flatter Little, convincing him to stand up and challenge Locky's right of leadership as (filled with confidence) Little announces to a crowd that he is their new leader and states that he will save all their lives. Locky argues against him stating the sky is not falling. The two argue about it until Locky states, "if the sky is falling, why doesn't it hit me on the head?" From his hiding place, Loxy uses a slingshot to shoot a star shaped piece of wood at him in the head, knocking him out. This shocks everyone and are convinced that Little was right about the sky all along. When they ask him what they should do, Foxy Loxy whispers to Little to lead them to "the cave" believing this is the right thing to do. Little leads the panicked masses out of the farm, through the woods and into the cave (which is actually Loxy's den) and once everyone is inside, Loxy goes in after them and seals up the entrance. The narrator reassures the audience that everything will be alright, but the cartoon closes with a stuffed Loxy picking his teeth and arranging the wishbones of the devoured birds in a row resembling a war cemetery. The narrator is shocked and insists that this is not how the story was supposed to end. Foxy Loxy breaks the fourth wall by reminding the narrator not to believe everything he reads.

Cast
 Frank Graham as Narrator / Foxy Loxy / Chicken Little / Cocky Locky / Turkey Lurkey / Additional characters
 Clarence Nash as Ducks (quacking sounds only)
 Florence Gill as Hens (clucking sounds only)

Foxy Loxy and Mein Kampf
According to Disney historian David Gerstein in a comment on Andreas Deja's blog, the studio had the title of the book that Foxy Loxy reads changed from Hitler's Mein Kampf to the generic Psychology in a postwar reissue.

Other appearances
Cocky Locky makes a cameo appearance in Mickey's Christmas Carol dancing at Fezzywig's party. Chicken Little makes a cameo appearance in the Toontown countryside in Who Framed Roger Rabbit.

Home media
The short was released on May 18, 2004 on Walt Disney Treasures: Walt Disney on the Front Lines and on December 6, 2005 on Walt Disney Treasures: Disney Rarities - Celebrated Shorts: 1920s–1960s.

See also
 Chicken Little (2005 film) - An animated film that is Disney’s second adaptation of the fable. This film is unrelated to the 1943 cartoon.
 The Fox and the Crow - The Columbia cartoon series starring Frank Graham as both the titular fox and crow

References

External links
 
 
 Chicken Little (1943) at Letterboxd

1940s English-language films
1943 animated films
1943 short films
1940s Disney animated short films
Animated films about chickens
Animated films about foxes
Films directed by Clyde Geronimi
Films produced by Walt Disney
Films based on fairy tales
Films based on fables
Films set on farms
Films set in forests
American animated short films
American parody films
Fairy tale parody films
Films scored by Oliver Wallace